Herbert John Streicher (August 27, 1947 – March 19, 2013), better known by his professional pseudonym Harry Reems, was an American pornographic actor and later a successful real estate agent. His most famous roles were as Doctor Young in the 1972 pornographic cult classic Deep Throat and The Teacher in the 1973 classic The Devil in Miss Jones. Throughout the 1970s and into the mid-1980s, he was one of the most prolific performers in the adult film industry. He became the first American actor to be prosecuted solely for appearing in a film. He retired from the industry in 1985.

Early life
Reems was born Herbert John Streicher on August 27, 1947, into a Jewish family. He was the youngest of three children. His father Don Streicher worked as a salesman before becoming a bookmaker. His mother, Rose, was a model. Harry's father later entered the printing industry and was wealthy enough to move the family to Westchester, New York. In 1965, at age 18, he went the University of Pittsburgh to become a dentist. However he later enlisted in the United States Marine Corps, from which he received an honorable discharge following hardship leave. In 1967, he moved to East Village in Manhattan where his brother and roommate were gaining experience as actors. His early (non-porn) acting career were principally in off-Broadway theater for La MaMa Experimental Theatre Club, New York Theater Ensemble and National Shakespeare Company.

Career
Prior to appearing in Deep Throat, Streicher was chosen by filmmaker Eduardo Cemano to do a hardcore scene in a film called The Deviates, which had been released previously as a softcore film. It was a body-painting sex scene that Streicher later described as his most painful sex experience because the tempera paint used began to dry and crack. Cemano then starred him in his first 16 mm feature film, called The Weirdos and the Oddballs, which was later upgraded to 35 mm and released as Zora Knows Best. It was for this film that he changed his name to Peter Long.

Looking for ways to support himself, Streicher appeared in dozens of short silent stag films, often referred to as "loops", during the early 1970s. He eventually went on to appear in approximately 140 feature-length sexploitation and hardcore films between 1971 and 1974 and from 1982 to 1985, with Deep Throat (1972) and The Devil in Miss Jones (1973) being the best known, as well as grindhouse roughies like Forced Entry (1973) and Sex Wish (1976); in the former he plays a sadistic Vietnam veteran hellbent on rape and murder – later described by Streicher as the one film he regretted appearing in – while in the latter he plays a husband-turned-vigilante seeking revenge over the rape and murder of his wife.

In 1975 he published a memoir, Here Comes Harry Reems, in which he details the early years of his adult film career. Reems also appeared in a couple of mainstream films, such as the sex comedy/horror film Case of the Full Moon Murders (1973), the drama Deadly Weapons (1974), horror films Demented (1980) and To All a Goodnight (1980), the comedy National Lampoon's Movie Madness (1982) and the TV movie The Cartier Affair (1984). He provided narration for the film Mae West (1982). He also appeared in several Swedish-produced porn films, including Justine & Juliette (1975), Bel Ami (1976) and Molly (1977), as well as the mainstream SS Operation Wolf Cub (1983).

For the production of Deep Throat in Miami, Florida in January 1972, Streicher was hired to be part of the lighting crew, but the director was unable to cast one of the roles and asked him to play the part. He was paid $250 for one day of acting work ($1,200 total). Streicher said that he was unaware that the director had given him the name "Harry Reems" until he saw the movie.

Trial and later years as an actor

Reems' appearance in Deep Throat led to his arrest by FBI agents in New York City in July 1974 and his indictment in Memphis, Tennessee, in June 1975 on federal charges of conspiracy to distribute obscenity across state lines. Reems called it forum shopping. He was convicted in April 1976 with 11 other individuals and four corporations.

Reems' conviction was overturned on appeal in April 1977, as his activities in making the film took place before a U.S. Supreme Court ruling on obscenity in 1973 (Miller v. California), and Reems was granted a new trial. The charges against Reems were dropped in August. The defense argued he was the first American actor to ever be prosecuted by the federal government merely for appearing in a film, and he received considerable support from established Hollywood and New York celebrities during his trial, including Jack Nicholson, Warren Beatty, Shirley MacLaine, Richard Dreyfuss, Colleen Dewhurst, Rod McKuen, Ben Gazzara, Mike Nichols, Julie Newmar, Dick Cavett, George Plimpton and Stephen Sondheim. Nicholson, Beatty, and Louise Fletcher were reportedly ready to testify on his behalf at his trial. Reems' successful appeal was handled by Alan Dershowitz. His autobiography Here Comes Harry Reems was published in 1975, in which he reported extensively on his first experience as an actor in adult movies.

Reems was cast in the 1978 musical film Grease as Coach Calhoun, but, out of fear that his notoriety would jeopardize the film's box office in the Southern United States, he was replaced by Sid Caesar.

Reems returned to the stage in the plays The Office Murders (1979) and What the Butler Saw (1981).

In 1982, after an eight-year hiatus from porn, Reems returned to the industry and performed in the film Society Affairs, and reportedly received a six-figure salary. In 1984, he starred in Those Young Girls with the notoriously then 16 year old Traci Lords (who had lied about her age). Reems retired from performing in porn in 1985. In the same year, he was included in the XRCO Hall of Fame; also included in the AVN Hall of Fame

Later years

After years of drug abuse and homelessness, Reems began his recovery in 1989 while living in Park City, Utah. He was married to Jeanne Sterret, a religious woman he had met while skiing in the same city. He then converted from Judaism to Christianity. "Being the low-bottom drunk that I was, I started going around to churches," said Reems. "I called myself a church gypsy." Reems credited his conversion to Reverend Mark Heiss, a former pastor with Park City Community Church in Park City, Utah.

Heiss was abruptly replaced at the church by someone else, for reasons Reems says were never explained; Reems left the congregation because he believed church attendance was "about putting money in the coffers." Outside organized religion, he continued to meditate, pray, and offer gratitude to God. "If I didn't put God in my life, I'd be dead now," he said. "I am not religious. I'm spiritual, 100 percent." He continued to identify himself as "Harry Reems", even using the name while he worked as a real estate agent. He later was a trustee at a local United Methodist church.

He was interviewed in the 2005 documentary Inside Deep Throat. Reems's entrance into the adult entertainment industry, his experience filming Deep Throat and its subsequent infamy and obscenity trials, are the subject of the 2010 play The Deep Throat Sex Scandal. During the Los Angeles run of the play, Reems died in Utah; his death was noted by the production.

In 2014, award-winning playwright Craig Hepworth opened his play Porno Chic about Reems and Lovelace and the fallout from Deep Throat in Manchester, UK. The play opened to rave reviews, and the 2016 production went on to win Best Drama at the GMF Awards. The play is set to return in 2018/19 for a UK tour.

Death
Reems died of pancreatic cancer on March 19, 2013, aged 65, at the Salt Lake City Veterans Administration Medical Center. He had no children.

Filmography

1969:
Crack-Up
1970:
Bacchanale as Hardcore inserts (uncredited)
The Cross and the Switchblade as Gang Member (uncredited)
Erecter Sex 3: Sex Ed 101
Erecter Sex 4: Pole Position
1971:
Dark Dreams as Jack
Klute as Discothèque Patron (uncredited)
Sex USA as Guy with Bisexual Girls (uncredited)
Vice Versa!
Mondo Porno as Guy on Couch (uncredited)
The Weirdos and the Oddballs as David
His Loving Daughter as Freddy (uncredited)
The Altar of Lust as Don
A Time to Love as Jon
1972:
Deep Sleep (as Harry Reemes / credit only)
Meatball
Cherry Blossom
Rivelazioni di un maniaco sessuale al capo della squadra mobile
Forbidden Under Censorship of the King
Deep Throat
The Abductors
Selling It
Mondo Porno
1973:
Girls in the Penthouse
Revolving Teens
Case of the Full Moon Murders
Loops
The New Comers (as Harry Reams)
The Collegiates
Over Sexposure
Filthiest Show in Town
The Devil in Miss Jones
Forced Entry
Head Nurse
Fast Ball
High Rise
Herbie (as Richard Hurt)
It Happened in Hollywood
Fleshpot on 42nd Street
The Female Response
1974:
Ape Over Love
Pleasure Cruise
Wet Rainbow
Doctor Feelgood
Memories Within Miss Aggie
Deadly Weapons
Teenage Cheerleader
Deep Throat Part II
College Girls
Hotel Hooker
Intensive Care
The Love Witch
A Touch of Genie as Himself
1975:
Sherlick Holmes
More
Linda Lovelace Meets Miss Jones
Every Inch a Lady
Butterflies
Justine och Juliette
Mae West (as narrator, television film)
Sexual Freedom in Brooklyn
Christy
Sometime Sweet Susan
Experiments in Ecstacy
1980:
Demented (as Bruce Gilchrist)
To All a Goodnight (as Dan Stryker)
1982:
National Lampoon's Movie Madness
1983:
Eighth Erotic Film Festival
Wolf Cubs
Vice Squad Cop ‘’Society Affairs1984:Sister DearestGirls on FireThose Young Girls (video)The Cartier Affair (television film)R.S.V.P. (film telewizyjny)For Your Thighs OnlyGirls of the Night (video)One Night at a TimePrivate Fantasies 4 (video)
1985:Private Fantasies VIThe Grafenberg SpotTower of PowerToo Naughty to Say NoBeverly Hills ExposedDeep Chill (video)Dream Lover (video)Educating Mandy (video)Erotica JonesFantasies UnltdHeart ThrobsHot BloodedHot Nights at the Blue Note CafeIndecent ItchLoose EndsLosing ControlLove Bites (video)Lucky in LoveLust in SpaceObsessionOlder Men with Young Girls (video)Oriental JadePassage to EcstasyRubdownTalk Dirty to Me One More TimeTen Little MaidensThe Girls of 'A' Team (video)TitillationTrashy LadyWet, Wild & Wicked (video)Whore of the Worlds (video)With Love from SusanWPINK-TV: Its Red Hot!! (video)

Awards
 1986AVN Award for Best Actor winnerTrashy Lady'' (film).

See also

Golden Age of Porn

References

External links
Long interview and retrospective (The Observer)
Bullz-Eye Harry Reems Interview 2005
Harry Reems on Inside Deep Throat, an interview with Channel 4

N.Y. Times Obituary for Harry Reems
United Methodist Reporter, Reems' Legacy More Than Porn
Interview with Reems in SCREW Magazine, May 20, 1974, reprinted in the August 30, 1976 issue.
findagrave.com

1947 births
2013 deaths
American male pornographic film actors
Converts to Protestantism from Judaism
Deaths from pancreatic cancer
Deaths from cancer in Utah
People from the Bronx
Military personnel from New York City
United States Marines
Pornographic film actors from New York (state)
American male film actors
University of Pittsburgh alumni
American United Methodists
American male stage actors
People convicted of obscenity
American people of Jewish descent
20th-century Methodists